Vyell Edward Walker (20 April 1837 – 3 January 1906) was an English cricketer and administrator.

Teddy Walker was born in Southgate, Middlesex and educated at Harrow School. He was the fifth of seven cricket playing brothers who resided at Arnos Grove. They played a major part in establishing the Middlesex County Cricket Club, which was founded in 1864. Their cricket ground in Southgate is maintained by the Walker Trust to this day.

Walker was a right-handed batsman and an underarm slow right arm bowler who represented Marylebone Cricket Club (MCC) (1856–1870), a Middlesex XI (1859–1863) and Middlesex County Cricket Club (1864–1877).

In 1859 for an All-England Eleven  against Surrey County Cricket Club at The Oval he scored 20 not out, then took all 10 of the Surrey wickets (for 74 runs). In the second innings he scored 108 not out and took another 4 wickets. This was in a season where only 2 other centuries were scored in first-class matches. He also took 10 for 104 for Middlesex against Lancashire in 1865.

A fine driving bat and perhaps the leading lob bowler of his day as well as a great captain of Middlesex and the Gentlemen.

He captained the county club (1864–1872) and also served as President of the Marylebone Cricket Club (1891–1892) and of Middlesex County Cricket Club (1899–1906). He died at Arnos Grove, aged 68.

See also
 Middlesex County Cricket Club
 The Walkers of Southgate

References

External links
 Cricinfo
 Cricket Archive
 Middlesex County Cricket Club Official website
 Cricinfo page on V.E. Walker

1837 births
1906 deaths
People educated at Harrow School
English cricketers
Presidents of Middlesex County Cricket Club
Presidents of the Marylebone Cricket Club
Middlesex cricket captains
People from Southgate, London
Marylebone Cricket Club cricketers
Gentlemen cricketers
Gentlemen of the South cricketers
North v South cricketers
Surrey Club cricketers
Southgate cricketers
Cricketers who have taken ten wickets in an innings
Gentlemen of England cricketers
Edward
Cricketers from Greater London
Gentlemen of Middlesex cricketers
Middlesex cricketers
R. D. Walker's XI cricketers
North of the Thames v South of the Thames cricketers